Insignificance is a mental or psychological state.

Insignificance may also refer to:

Insignificance, a 1982 stage play by Terry Johnson
Insignificance (film), a 1985 adaptation of Terry Johnson's play, directed by Nicolas Roeg
Insignificance (Hebe Tien album) or the title song, 2013
Insignificance (Jim O'Rourke album) or the title song, 2001
Insignificance (Porcupine Tree album) or the title song, 1997
"Insignificance", a song by Pearl Jam from Binaural
Insignificance: Hong Kong Stories, a 2018 short story collection by Xu Xi
Statistical insignificance

See also
Significance (disambiguation)